Loubier is a family name of French origin and may refer to:

Gabriel Loubier (born 1932), Canadian Union Nationale politician
Jean Loubier, German writer (19th century)
Jean-Marc Loubier, French businessman, CEO of Escada
Yvan Loubier (born 1959), Canadian Bloc Québécois / Parti Québécois politician